24th Uhlan Regiment of Crown Hetman Stanislaw Zolkiewski (Polish: 24 Pulk Ulanów im. Hetmana Wielkiego Koronnego Stanislawa Zolkiewskiego, 24 p.ul.) was a cavalry unit of the Polish Army in the Second Polish Republic. Formed in June 1920, it fought both in the Polish–Soviet War and the 1939 Invasion of Poland. The regiment was garrisoned in the town of Kraśnik, and belonged to the elite 10th Motorized Cavalry Brigade.

The history of the regiment dates back to June 1920, when it was formed in Lwów and Stanisławów. The unit was based on the 214th Volunteer Army Uhlan Regiment, and soon after forming, it was sent to fight against the Red Army in the area of Zamość, Volhynia and then Central Lithuania.

During the interbellum period the regiment was garrisoned in Kraśnik. As part of the 10th Motorized Cavalry Brigade, in late autumn of 1938 it entered the areas that had belonged to Czechoslovakia (see Zaolzie, Independent Operational Group Silesia). On November 27, 1938, the regiment clashed with Czechoslovak forces near the town of Ždiar, Slovakia.

During the Invasion of Poland, the regiment fought in the Battle of Jordanów, the Battle of Wysoka, and several other locations, including Łańcut, Rzeszów and Radymno. On September 19, 1939, it crossed the Hungarian border, escaping German or Soviet captivity. In recognition of the bravery of its soldiers, the unit was awarded the Virtuti Militari.

In 1940, the Kraśnik Uhlans were re-created in France, and then in England. In 1943, the regiment became an armoured unit, fighting in Western Europe as part of the 10th Armoured Cavalry Brigade.

Commandants 
 Colonel Tadeusz Zolkiewski (1920), 
 Major Jan Kanty Olszewski (1921), 
 Colonel Rudolf Lang (1921–1929), 
 Colonel Kazimierz Halicki (1929–1932), 
 Colonel Kazimierz Dworak (1932–1940), 
 Colonel Jerzy Deskur (1940–1942), 
 Colonel Bogumil Szumski (1942–1943), 
 Major Jan Kanski (1943–1944), 
 Colonel Romuald Dowbor (1944–1947), 
 Major Tadeusz Wysocki (1947).

Symbols 
Regimental flag, funded by former soldiers of the 214th Volunteer Army Uhlan Regiment, was handed to the unit by Józef Piłsudski, in Warsaw on April 30, 1923. It featured the sign "214 PU A.O." and the inscription "Honour and Fatherland" on one side, and the number 24 together with the White Eagle on the other side. In the autumn of 1939, the flag was taken to France, and then to Great Britain. On November 11, 1966 in London, the flag was awarded Silver Cross of the Virtuti Militari, by General Władysław Anders.

The badge, approved in January 1928, was shaped after the Cross of Valour, with a silver Eagle in the middle.

Sources 
 Piotr Bauer: Zarys historii wojennej pułków polskich w kampanii wrześniowej. 17 Pułk Ułanów Wielkopolskich. Warszawa: Oficyna Wydawnicza „Ajaks", 1994
 Henryk Smaczny: Księga kawalerii polskiej 1914–1947: rodowody, barwa, broń. Warszawa: TESCO, 1989

Cavalry regiments of Poland
Military units and formations established in 1918
Military units and formations of Poland in World War II
Lublin Voivodeship (1919–1939)